In mathematics, the Pearcey integral is defined as

 

The Pearcey integral is a class of canonical diffraction integrals, often used in wave propagation and optical diffraction problems The first numerical evaluation of this integral was evaluated using the quadrature formula in Trevor Pearcey.

In optics, the Pearcey integral can be used to model diffraction effects at a cusp caustic.

References

Special functions